The following lists events that happened during 1917 in Chile.

Incumbents
President of Chile: Juan Luis Sanfuentes

Events

May
7 May – The Graneros Unido football club is established.

Births
date unknown – José Piñera Carvallo (d. 1991)
17 January – Ramón Cardemil (d. 2007)
25 May – Roberto Viaux (d. 2005)
10 September – Miguel Serrano (d. 2009)
4 October – Violeta Parra (d. 1967)
20 December – Gonzalo Rojas (d. 2011)

Deaths 
9 March – Ramón Ángel Jara
7 June – Alberto Romero Herrera

References 

 
Years of the 20th century in Chile
Chile